In chemistry, an acyl group is a moiety derived by the removal of one or more hydroxyl groups from an oxoacid, including inorganic acids. It contains a double-bonded oxygen atom and an organyl group or hydrogen in the case of formyl group. In organic chemistry, the acyl group (IUPAC name alkanoyl if the organyl group is alkyl) is usually derived from a carboxylic acid, in which case it has the formula , where R represents an organyl group that is linked to the carbon atom of the group by a single bond. Although the term is almost always applied to organic compounds, acyl groups can in principle be derived from other types of acids such as sulfonic acids and phosphonic acids. In the most common arrangement, acyl groups are attached to a larger molecular fragment, in which case the carbon and oxygen atoms are linked by a double bond.

Compounds
Well-known acyl compounds are the acyl chlorides, such as acetyl chloride (CH3COCl) and benzoyl chloride (C6H5COCl). These compounds, which are treated as sources of acylium cations, are good reagents for attaching acyl groups to various substrates. Amides (RC(O)NR′2) and esters (RC(O)OR′) are classes of acyl compounds, as are ketones (RC(O)R′) and aldehydes (RC(O)H), where R and R′ stand for organyl (or hydrogen in the case of formyl).

Acylium cations, radicals, and anions

Acylium ions are cations of the formula . The carbon–oxygen bond length in these cations is near 1.1 Å (110-112 pm), which is shorter than the 112.8 pm of carbon monoxide and indicates triple-bond character.

The carbon centres of acylium ions generally have a linear geometry and sp atomic hybridization, and are best represented by a resonance structure bearing a formal positive charge on the oxygen (rather than carbon): . They are characteristic fragments observed in EI-mass spectra of ketones.

Acylium ions are common reactive intermediates, for example in the Friedel–Crafts acylation and many other organic reactions such as the Hayashi rearrangement. Salts containing acylium ions can be generated by removal of the halide from acyl halides:
RC(O)Cl + SbCl5 -> [RCO]+[SbCl6]-

Acyl radicals are readily generated from aldehydes by hydrogen-atom abstraction. However, they undergo rapid decarbonylation to afford the alkyl radical:

Acyl anions are almost always unstable—usually too unstable to be exploited synthetically. They readily react with the neutral aldehyde to form an acyloin dimer. Hence, synthetic chemists have developed various acyl anion synthetic equivalents, such as dithianes, as surrogates. However, as a partial exception, hindered dialkylformamides (e.g., diisopropylformamide, HCONiPr2) can undergo deprotonation at low temperature (−78 °C) with lithium diisopropylamide as the base to form a carbamoyl anion stable at these temperatures.

In biochemistry
In biochemistry there are many instances of acyl groups, in all major categories of biochemical molecules.

Acyl-CoAs are acyl derivatives formed via fatty acid metabolism. Acetyl-CoA, the most common derivative, serves as an acyl donor in many biosynthetic transformations. Such acyl compounds are thioesters.

Names of acyl groups of amino acids are formed by replacing the -ine suffix with -yl. For example, the acyl group of glycine is glycyl, and of lysine is lysyl.

Names of acyl groups of ribonucleoside monophosphates such as AMP (5′-adenylic acid), GMP (5′-guanylic acid), CMP (5′-cytidylic acid), and UMP (5′-uridylic acid) are adenylyl, guanylyl, cytidylyl, and uridylyl respectively.

In phospholipids, the acyl group of phosphatidic acid is called phosphatidyl-.

Finally, many saccharides are acylated.

In organometallic chemistry and catalysis

Acyl ligands are intermediates in many carbonylation reactions, which are important in some catalytic reactions. Metal acyls arise usually via insertion of carbon monoxide into metal–alkyl bonds. Metal acyls also arise from reactions involving acyl chlorides with low-valence metal complexes or by the reaction of organolithium compounds with metal carbonyls. Metal acyls are often described by two resonance structures, one of which emphasizes the basicity of the oxygen center. O-alkylation of metal acyls gives Fischer carbene complexes.

Nomenclature
The common names of acyl groups are derived typically by replacing the -ic acid suffix of the corresponding carboxylic acid's common name with -yl (or -oyl), as shown in the table below.

In the IUPAC nomenclature of organic chemistry, the systematic names of acyl groups are derived exactly by replacing the -yl suffix of the corresponding hydrocarbyl group's systemic name (or the -oic acid suffix of the corresponding carboxylic acid's systemic name) with -oyl, as shown in the table below.

The acyls are between the hydrocarbyls and the carboxylic acids.

The hydrocarbyl group names that end in -yl are not acyl groups, but alkyl groups derived from alkanes (methyl, ethyl, propyl, butyl), alkenyl groups derived from alkenes (propenyl, butenyl), or aryl groups (benzyl).

Acyl species
In acyloxy groups the acyl group is bonded to oxygen: R−C(=O)−O−R′ where R−C(=O) is the acyl group.

Acylium ions are cations of the type R−C+=O ↔ R−C≡O+ and play an important role as intermediates in organic reactions for example the Hayashi rearrangement.

See also
Acylation
Functional group

References

External links

 
Functional groups